Love in Canada is a 1979 Indian Hindi-language romance film directed by S. Ramanathan, and produced by Tyagi Janeshwar Dayal Tyagi Films Ltd. banner. It stars Jeetendra, Vinod Mehra, Moushumi Chatterjee, Shelley Homick in lead roles and music composed by Hemant Kumar.

Plot
Dr. Amish (Vinod Mehra) a renowned brain specialist distressed owing to breakup with Lisa (Shelley Homick). So, he trips Canada with his Casanova friend Dev (Jeetendra). On the way, they spot an accident whereupon they rescue a family of Mr. Khanna (Iftekhar) and befriends. They all plan a tour together with Khanna's wife Shoba (Indrani Mukherjee) and their widowed daughter-in-law Seema (Moushumi Chatterjee). Despite Dev flirts Seema at outset, the next, he truly falls for her. Here, destiny brings Lisa to Amith but conceit makes them stand far. Meanwhile, the elders want to couple up Amith & Seema, overhearing it, Dev quiets. Then, Amith finds that Lisa is in critical condition and needs to get operated but he is dismayed. During that plight, Seema boasts his courage who subdues the situation. Finally, Amith & Lisa reconcile as well as Dev & Seema too knitted.

Cast
Jeetendra as Dev 
Vinod Mehra as Dr. Ameeth 
Moushumi Chatterjee as Seema   
Shelley Homick as Lisa
Asrani as Bansi
Iftekhar as Mr. Khanna
Aruna Irani as Aruna
Indrani Mukherjee as Sonba
Ranjna Sachdeva as Lata

Soundtrack

External links

References

1979 films
1970s Hindi-language films
Films directed by S. Ramanathan
Films scored by Hemant Kumar
Films set in Toronto
Films shot in Toronto